The following lists events that happened during 2015 in Zambia.

Incumbents
President: Guy Scott (until 25 January), Edgar Lungu (starting 25 January)
Vice-President: Inonge Wina (starting 25 January)
Chief Justice: Ernest Sakala (until 2 March), Irene Mambilima (starting 2 March)

Events

January
 January 20 - Voters in Zambia go to the polls for a presidential election following the October 2014 death of incumbent President Michael Sata. Defence Minister Edgar Lungu (the Patriotic Front) and Hakainde Hichilema (the United Party for National Development) seek the office.
 January 21 - Heavy rains in Zambia cause delays in voting and counting in the presidential election with announcements to resume the next day.
 January 24 - Edgar Lungu of the ruling Patriotic Front party wins the Zambian presidential election.

References

 
Years of the 21st century in Zambia
2010s in Zambia
Zambia
Zambia